Pierpaolo Bisoli (born 20 November 1966) is an Italian football manager and former midfielder, currently in charge as head coach of  club Südtirol.

Career

Playing
Born in Porretta Terme, Bisoli started his professional career in 1984 with Pistoiese, where he spent a total of three seasons. He then played for a handful of minor teams before to join Cagliari in 1991, becoming a mainstay for the Sardinians. He spent six seasons for the rossoblu, marking a total of 167 appearances and also taking part in the club's 1994–95 UEFA Cup stint. In 1997, he moved to newly promoted Serie A team Empoli, where he played for two seasons. He then played for Perugia, Brescia and Pistoiese before to retire in 2003 after a season with amateur hometown club Porretta.

Coaching
Following his retirement from active football, Bisoli accepted an assistant coaching role at Fiorentina, working alongside head coach Emiliano Mondonico during the 2004–05 season. He then became head coach of Serie C2 team Prato, where he worked for two seasons. From 2007 he is head coach of newly promoted Serie C1 side Foligno, where he surprisingly won a promotion playoff spot in his first season with the club, and then achieving a promotion playoff spot in his second season with the Umbrian minnows. From July 2008 he is head coach of Cesena in the former Serie C1, now rebranded as Lega Pro Prima Divisione, managing to guide the bianconeri to win the league title in his first season in charge of the club.

He was confirmed head coach of Cesena also for the 2009–10 season, which proved to be a very successful one as the club from Romagna joined the race for direct promotion to Serie A, a league Cesena has not played in since 1991. He ultimately guided Cesena to a historical promotion in the final game of the season, after the Bianconeri from Romagna ended the league in second place, thus ending a 19-year absence from the top flight for his club. He left Cesena at the end of the season to join his former club Cagliari, agreeing a contract with the Sardinian Serie A club. His experience at Cagliari as head coach however proved to be highly unsuccessful, and he was ultimately dismissed on 15 November 2010 after a 0–1 home loss that left the Sardinians in 19th place.

On 26 May 2011 Bisoli was named as the new coach of Bologna, but he was sacked on 4 October 2011, with the club the bottom of the table and replaced by Stefano Pioli.

On 11 September 2012, he was named new coach of Cesena en place of the sacked Nicola Campedelli. In the 2013–14 Serie B he successfully led Cesena to triumph in the promotion playoff and back to the top flight. He was however dismissed on 8 December 2014 due to poor results, with Cesena deep in the relegation zone.

He was subsequently appointed as head coach of Serie C club Padova for the 2017–18 season, during which he led the club to win the league title and direct promotion to Serie B. Confirmed for the following campaign in the Italian second tier, he was successively sacked on 6 November 2018 due to poor results. He was reinstated as the head coach of Padova on 28 December 2018.

He was named head coach of struggling Serie B club Cremonese on 5 March 2020, and successively confirmed for the 2020–21 Serie B season after guiding the team to safety. He was however sacked on 7 January 2021 due to poor results.

On 17 February 2022 he was unveiled as the new head coach of Serie B club Cosenza until the end of the season. On 15 June 2022, after guiding them to safety, Cosenza announced that Bisoli will not continue coaching the club.

On 29 August 2022, Bisoli was announced as the new head coach of newly-promoted Serie B club Südtirol.

Personal life
Pierpaolo has a son Dimitri Bisoli as a professional footballer.

Managerial statistics

References

External links

Pierpaolo Bisoli at Soccerway

1966 births
Living people
Sportspeople from the Metropolitan City of Bologna
Association football midfielders
Italian footballers
Italian football managers
U.S. Pistoiese 1921 players
U.S. Alessandria Calcio 1912 players
S.S. Arezzo players
Cagliari Calcio players
Empoli F.C. players
A.C. Perugia Calcio players
Brescia Calcio players
Serie A players
Serie B players
Serie C players
A.C. Cesena managers
Cagliari Calcio managers
Bologna F.C. 1909 managers
Calcio Padova managers
U.S. Cremonese managers
Cosenza Calcio managers
F.C. Südtirol managers
Serie A managers
Serie B managers
Footballers from Emilia-Romagna